Bioparque Los Ocarros or Los Ocarros is a zoo park located in the city of Villavicencio in the country of Colombia. The biopark houses animals of the region and works closely with the environmental authorities to preserve the local fauna.

Los Ocarros  are divided into 7 different sections with 38 habitats that are home to about 181 species of animals. The biological park also has an artificial lake that is home to a variety of turtles, fish and birds.

Gallery

References

Zoos in Colombia
Tourist attractions in Colombia
Buildings and structures in Meta Department
Zoos established in 2003
2003 establishments in Colombia